Suter Grant Sullivan (October 14, 1872 in Baltimore, Maryland – April 19, 1925 in Baltimore, Maryland) was an infielder in Major League Baseball from 1898 to 1899. He played for the St. Louis Browns and Cleveland Spiders.

References

External links

1872 births
1925 deaths
Major League Baseball infielders
St. Louis Browns (NL) players
Cleveland Spiders players
19th-century baseball players
Baseball players from Baltimore
New Castle Salamanders players
Buffalo Bisons (minor league) players
Scranton Red Sox players
Wilkes-Barre Coal Barons players
Detroit Tigers (Western League) players
Cleveland Lake Shores players
Providence Clamdiggers (baseball) players
Providence Grays (minor league) players
Louisville Colonels (minor league) players
Kansas City Blues (baseball) players
Louisville Colonels (minor league) managers